The statue of Frederick the Great is installed outside Charlottenburg Palace in Berlin, Germany.

External links

 

Buildings and structures in Charlottenburg-Wilmersdorf
Charlottenburg
Cultural depictions of Frederick the Great
Monuments and memorials in Berlin
Outdoor sculptures in Berlin
Statues in Berlin
Sculptures of men in Germany